is a former Japanese football player.

Playing career
Otsuka was born in Oguni, Kumamoto on July 7, 1982. After graduating from high school, he joined J1 League club Avispa Fukuoka in 2001. However he could not play at all in the match and Avispa was relegated to J2 League end of 2001 season. He debuted in 2002 and played many matches as midfielder until 2003. However he could not play many matches from 2004. Although Avispa won the 2nd place in 2005 season and was promoted to J1 from 2006, he could not play at all in the match in 2006. In October 2006, he moved to Regional Leagues club V-Varen Nagasaki on loan. In 2007, he returned to Avispa which was relegated to J2 from 2007. However he could hardly play in the match. In 2008, he re-joined V-Varen. He played many matches as regular player and V-Varen was promoted to Japan Football League from 2009. He retired end of 2010 season.

Club statistics

References

External links

1982 births
Living people
Association football people from Kumamoto Prefecture
Japanese footballers
J1 League players
J2 League players
Japan Football League players
Avispa Fukuoka players
V-Varen Nagasaki players
Association football midfielders